Peter Scholze (born 11 December 1987) is a German mathematician known for his work in arithmetic geometry. He has been a professor at the University of Bonn since 2012 and director at the Max Planck Institute for Mathematics since 2018. He has been called one of the leading mathematicians in the world. He won the Fields Medal in 2018, which is regarded as the highest professional honor in mathematics.

Early life and education 
Scholze was born in Dresden and grew up in Berlin. His father is a physicist, his mother a computer scientist, and his sister studied chemistry. As a student, Scholze participated in the International Mathematical Olympiad, winning three gold medals and one silver medal.

He studied at the University of Bonn and completed his bachelor's degree in three semesters and his master's degree in two further semesters. He obtained his Ph.D. in 2012 under the supervision of Michael Rapoport.

Career
From July 2011 until 2016, Scholze was a Research Fellow of the Clay Mathematics Institute in New Hampshire. In 2012, shortly after completing his PhD, he was made full professor at the University of Bonn, becoming at the age of 24 the youngest full professor in Germany. 

In fall 2014, Scholze was appointed the Chancellor's Professor at University of California, Berkeley, where he taught a course on p-adic geometry. 

In 2018, Scholze was appointed as a director of the Max Planck Institute for Mathematics in Bonn.

Work 

Scholze's work has concentrated on purely local aspects of arithmetic geometry such as p-adic geometry and its applications. He presented in a more compact form some of the previous fundamental theories pioneered by Gerd Faltings, Jean-Marc Fontaine and later by Kiran Kedlaya. His PhD thesis on perfectoid spaces yields the solution to a special case of the weight-monodromy conjecture.

Scholze and Bhargav Bhatt have developed a theory of prismatic cohomology, which has been described as progress towards motivic cohomology by unifying singular cohomology, de Rham cohomology, ℓ-adic cohomology, and crystalline cohomology.

Scholze and Dustin Clausen proposed a program for condensed mathematics—a project to unify various mathematical subfields, including topology, geometry, functional analysis and number theory.

Awards 

In 2012, he was awarded the Prix and Cours Peccot. He was awarded the 2013 SASTRA Ramanujan Prize. In 2014, he received the Clay Research Award. In 2015, he was awarded the Frank Nelson Cole Prize in Algebra, and the Ostrowski Prize.

He received the Fermat Prize 2015 from the Institut de Mathématiques de Toulouse. In 2016, he was awarded the Leibniz Prize 2016 by the German Research Foundation. He declined the $100,000 "New Horizons in Mathematics Prize" of the 2016 Breakthrough Prizes. His turning down of the prize received little media attention.

In 2017 he became a member of the German Academy of Sciences Leopoldina.

In 2018, at thirty years old, Scholze, who was at the time serving as a mathematics professor at the University of Bonn, became one of the youngest mathematicians ever to be awarded the Fields Medal for "transforming arithmetic algebraic geometry over p-adic fields through his introduction of perfectoid spaces, with application to Galois representations, and for the development of new cohomology theories".

In 2019, Scholze received the Great Cross of Merit of the Order of Merit of the Federal Republic of Germany.

In 2022 he became a foreign member of the Royal Society and was awarded the Pius XI Medal from the Pontifical Academy of Sciences.

Personal life 
Scholze is married to a fellow mathematician and has a daughter.

References

External links 
 Prof. Dr. Peter Scholze,  University of Bonn 
 Prof. Dr. Peter Scholze,  Hausdorff Center for Mathematics
 Prof. Dr. Peter Scholze, Academy of Sciences Leopoldina 
 
  ("Peter Scholze And The Future of Arithmetic Geometry")
 Scopus preview – Scholze, Peter – Author details – Scopus
  
 

1987 births
Living people
Fields Medalists
21st-century German mathematicians
Scientists from Berlin
International Mathematical Olympiad participants
Commanders Crosses of the Order of Merit of the Federal Republic of Germany
Academic staff of the University of Bonn
University of Bonn alumni
Arithmetic geometers
People from Friedrichshain-Kreuzberg
Members of the German Academy of Sciences Leopoldina
Foreign Members of the Royal Society
Max Planck Institute directors